José Antonio de Alzate y Ramírez (20 November 1737 – 2 February 1799) was a priest in New Spain, scientist, historian, cartographer, and journalist.

Life and career

He was born in Ozumba in 1737, the child of Felipe de Alzate and María Josefa Ramírez, a descendant of Juana Inés de la Cruz. He studied in the Colegio de San Ildefonso in Mexico City, graduating as a bachelor in theology in 1756. A priest from the age of 20, he was also a corresponding member of the French and Spanish academies of science, and one of the earliest trustworthy observers of Mexican meteorology. He attained a high reputation as a zoologist and botanist, and his researches led the way for modern exploration of Mexican antiquities. He published the Gaceta de Literatura, and an essay titled La limite des niéges perpetuelles en Volcan Popocatepetl.

The natural sciences, physics, astronomy and mathematics were for him subjects that deserved great attention. He conducted several scientific experiments, and wrote numerous articles that were published in science journals.

Inaugurated in 1768, his Diario literario de Méjico [Literary Newspaper of Mexico] was suspended after only three months. He later created, in 1788, the Gaceta de Literatura [Newspaper of Literature], that was published until 1795 (115 issues). This periodical inspired many of his countrymen to follow his example. His account of Xochicalco was the first published description of these interesting ruins.

More than thirty treatises on various subjects are due to his pen. Among other works, he wrote Observaciones meteorológicas [Weather observations] (1769), Observación del paso de Venus por el disco del Sol [Observation of the passage of Venus by the disc of the Sun] (1770), Modelo y descripción de los hornos de Almadén [Model and description of the furnaces of Almadén], notes, additions and maps for the Historia Antigua de México [Ancient History of Mexico], written by Francisco Javier Clavijero, and a Mapa de la América del Norte [Map of North America].

Astronomy, physics, meteorology, antiquities, and metallurgy, were among the topics on which he wrote, but he also devoted serious attention to certain industries. Thus the growing of silk in Mexico was the subject of several of his papers. He wrote a dissertation on the use of ammonia in combating mephitic gases in abandoned mines, and also prepared maps of New Spain (Mexico). In 1772, he published work that showed that the well-known psychedelic effects of pipiltzintzintli were due to natural causes and not the work of the devil (Memoria del uso que hacen los indios de los pipiltzintzintlis; México, D.F.: Universidad Nacional Autónoma de México). A study from 2020 confirms that he actively fought for the legislation of medical cannabis. He was frequently opposed, even reviled, at home, but the French Academy of Sciences made him a corresponding member, and the viceroys of Mexico and the archbishops entrusted him with sundry scientific missions.

He was a member of the Royal Botanical Garden of Madrid. He died in Mexico City in 1799.

In his honor, the Sociedad Científica Antonio Alzate [Antonio Alzate Scientific Society] was created in 1884. In 1935, this society became the National Academy of Sciences. A dam and reservoir are named in his honor in the State of Mexico, north of Toluca. Plant genus Alzatea is named after him

See also
List of Roman Catholic scientist-clerics
Spanish American Enlightenment

References

Further reading

 Beltrán, Enrique, "Alzate y Ramírez, José Antonio" Dictionary of Scientific Biography volume 1. New York: Charles Scribner's Sons 1970. 
 Codding, Mitchell A., “Perfecting the geography of New Spain: Alzate and the Cartographic legacy of Sigüenza y Góngora,” Colonial Latin American Review, vol 2, 1994, pp. 185–219. 
Warren, J. Benedict, "An Introductory Survey of Secular Writings in the European Tradition on Colonial Middle America, 1503-1818, item 97, "José Antonio de Alzate y Ramírez, (1737-96)" in Handbook of Middle American Indians, vol. 13. Guide to Ethnohistorical Sources, Howard F. Cline, volume editor. Austin: University of Texas Press 1973, p. 90.
 Alzate, Jose Antonio de, Memorias y Ensayos. Mexico: Universidad Autonoma de Mexico 1985.

1737 births
1799 deaths
Writers from the State of Mexico
People from Ozumba
18th-century Mexican journalists
Male journalists
Mexican astronomers
Mexican biologists
Mexican cartographers
Mexican people of Basque descent
Catholic clergy scientists
18th-century cartographers
18th-century Mexican Roman Catholic priests
18th-century Mexican historians
18th-century male writers